Trichomesosa bifasciata is a species of beetle in the family Cerambycidae, and the only species in the genus Trichomesosa. It was described by Pic in 1925.

References

Mesosini
Beetles described in 1925